The Myanmar civil war, also called the Myanmar Spring Revolution, is an ongoing civil war following Myanmar's long-running insurgencies which escalated significantly in response to the 2021 military coup d'état and the subsequent violent crackdown on anti-coup protests.

In the months following the coup, the opposition began to coalesce around the National Unity Government, which launched an offensive against the junta. By 2022, the opposition controlled substantial, though sparsely populated, territory. In many villages and towns, the junta's attacks drove out tens of thousands of people. On the second anniversary of the coup, in February 2023, Min Aung Hlaing admitted to losing stable control over "more than a third" of townships. Independent observers note the real number is likely far higher, with as few as 72 out of 330 townships and all major population centers remaining under stable control.

UNOCHA said that as of early September 2022, 974,000 people had been internally displaced since the coup. Between the coup and June 2022, over 40,000 people fled into neighboring countries, including many from communities close to the borders that came under attack by junta forces.

Background 

On the morning of 1 February 2021, the Tatmadaw successfully deposed the elected Myanmar government, forming a military junta. Former president Win Myint, Aung San Suu Kyi, and several other members of the National League for Democracy were detained during early morning raids and Min Aung Hlaing was placed as the Commander-in-Chief of Defence Services and de facto ruler of the nation.

The exact motives behind the coup are unclear, and the Tatmadaw claims the 2020 general elections had 8.6 million voter irregularities in the days before the coup but presented no evidence. It is believed that the coup may have been a way to re-establish the military's long-reigning power over the country which ended ten years prior.

The bloody repression of anti-coup demonstrations led to the creation of armed groups to fight the State Administration Council, the military junta. Gathered under the name of the People's Defence Force (PDF) and the orders of the National Unity Government (NUG), formed by former parliamentarians in office before the coup d'état, the PDF and the NUG officially declared a "defensive war" against the military regime in September 2021. The ACLED estimated that as of 29 July 2022, around 23,521 people in total had been killed in the violence following the 2021 coup.

Existing conflict

Insurgencies have been ongoing in Myanmar since 1948 and have largely been ethnic-based. Communist insurgencies and the Karen National Union were the primary opposition actors to the central government. Over the 20th century, several prominent ethnic armed organisations (EAOs) rose and fell in influence and control. Larger rebel factions such as the Kachin Independence Army formed in response to Ne Win's 1962 Burmese coup d'état and its increased political repression. The 8888 Uprising in response to the totalitarian rule of Ne Win resulted in some of the first modern Bamar militias forming from protestors heading to areas under ethnic rebel control.

In the aftermath of the 8888 Uprising, the State Law and Order Restoration Council, later called the State Peace and Development Council, formed a military junta. The Tatmadaw severely weakened ethnic insurgent groups, destroying most of their bases and strongholds through the 1990s. By the time of the 2011–2015 Myanmar political reforms, the junta had regained control of many long-time rebel strongholds including Kokang and the KNU-controlled Karen State.

As part of its political reforms and democratization, the 2008 Constitution created self-administered zones with increased autonomy. In 2015, the Nationwide Ceasefire Agreement (NCA) was signed between 8 EAOs and the central government. However, as soon as 2018, the NCA had already begun to fall apart due to alleged violations of the agreement by Tatmadaw soldiers entering EAO territories to build roads. Many non-signatories continued the conflict. The most internationally well-known of these is the Arakan Rohingya Salvation Army, whose conflict in 2016 led to the Rohingya genocide by the central government in 2017. In late 2016, four non-signatories of the NCA formed the Northern Alliance, including the Kachin Independence Army and Arakan Army, engaged in war with the central government and other EAOs. After attacks that continued into 2020, a ceasefire was signed with the Arakan Army.

Prelude

Armed protestors

In late March, it was reported that dozens of protesters had travelled to Myanmar's border areas to enlist in and train under one of the country's many insurgent groups, elevating the risk of a countrywide civil war. The Committee Representing Pyidaungsu Hluttaw also proposed the formation of a "federal armed force" to combat the military, and in late March the Arakan Army (AA) threatened to end its ceasefire with the military should the latter "persist in massacring civilians".

During late March, protesters increasingly began arming themselves with homemade weapons such as guns in an attempt to defend themselves against attacks by the military. Simultaneously, clashes with soldiers and IED attacks against administrative buildings and police stations became more common as the trend of protesters using armed resistance rose.

Renewed ethnic conflict

The unrest across the nation and the increased need for junta troops in previously peaceful urban areas strengthened EAOs. The Kachin Independence Army (KIA) has already been on the offensive against the military since February and seized the military base of Alaw Bum near the town of Laiza on 25 March. The next day, the Karen National Liberation Army (KNLA) attacked a military base, killing 10 soldiers and taking others hostages in the first attack on the military since the protests began. The following day saw the 2021 Kalay clashes, the first openly armed resistance by protesters in the town of Kalay against the junta. Protestors used homemade weapons against soldiers and security forces attacking a protest camp.

The military junta declared that it would cease all military operations on 29 March and hold bilateral negotiations with ethnic armed groups. However, the KIA continued its offensives stating that the Myanmar Army had continued operations as usual. Through April, the informal clashes intensified, such as on 8 April when protesters fought back against soldiers with hunting rifles and firebombs in a battle that resulted in 11 protesters' deaths. The same day, the country surpassed 600 deaths related to anti-coup protests since 1 February.

Seven insurgent groups who were signatories to the Nationwide Ceasefire Agreement aligned themselves with the Committee Representing Pyidaungsu Hluttaw, including the All Burma Student Democratic Front and the Karen National Union. The Northern Alliance, comprising the Arakan Army, the Ta'ang National Liberation Army and the Myanmar National Democratic Alliance Army, attacked a police station in Naungmon, Shan State, killing at least 10 police officers and indicating their disregard of the junta's call for a ceasefire. In response, on 11 April, the junta military launched a counter-attack to recapture the Alaw Bum base using airstrikes and ground troops, but had to retreat amidst heavy casualties.

New conflicts
On 26 April, the Battle of Mindat became one of the first large-scale conflicts arising from the 2021 coup. The Chinland Defense Force (CDF) began armed resistance in Mindat, Chin State. As a response, the junta cut off food and water supplies and declared martial law. Fighting began when a group of demonstrators outside the town's Aung San statue requested the release of six of their arrested colleagues, when a soldier of the regime allegedly fired at someone, prompting protesters to react.
According to an aid worker, more than 10,000 people have left Mindat in southern Chin State as the Myanmar military started an all-out operation to quell an armed revolt headed by local citizens. In conclusion, the battle lasted four days, killing 30 junta soldiers with no casualties for the CDF, and Mindat has been a ghost town since.

Onset of formal resistance

On 16 April, pro-democracy politician Min Ko Naing announced the formation of the National Unity Government, with members of ethnic minority groups in senior roles and said that ousted leaders Aung San Suu Kyi and Win Myint would retain their positions and that members of the Kachin and Karen minorities would have top priority in the new parallel government. In the same announcement, Min Ko Naing asked the international community for recognition over the junta.

The National Unity Government then declared the formation of an armed wing on 5 May, a date that is often cited as the start of the 2021–2023 Myanmar civil war. This armed wing was named the People's Defence Force (PDF) to protect its supporters from military junta attacks and as a first step towards a Federal Union Army. The People's Defence Force clashed with the Tatmadaw in the town of Muse on 23 May, killing at least 13 members of Myanmar's security forces. In early June, fighting erupted in Myawaddy District in which the military and Karen Border Guard Force (BGF) battling against a combined force of Karen ethnic armed groups and PDF had left dozens of junta troops killed.

Members of the Karenni People's Defence Force (KPDF) in Kayah State also captured and destroyed several Tatmadaw outposts near the state capital of Loikaw. Towards the end of May, the Tatmadaw used artillery and helicopters to strike PDF and KPDF positions in Loikaw and Demoso. On 30 May, the Kachin Independence Army joined the anti-coup People's Defence Force battling junta troops in Katha Township, killing eight regime soldiers. Fighting was also continuing in Putao, Hpakant and Momauk Township.

On 22 June, junta forces using armoured vehicles raided a safehouse of the PDF in Mandalay, detaining several fighters. Myanmar security forces killed at least 25 people in a confrontation with opponents of the military junta in the central town of Tabayin. 50 junta soldiers were reportedly killed in a series of landmine attacks by resistance fighters in Gangaw Township. These attacks occurred in Central Myanmar, also known as Anyar, an area that had rarely seen armed violence in recent times.

Declaration of war

On 7 September, the NUG declared a state emergency across the nation and launched a people's defensive war against the military junta.

The declaration of war increased the number of skirmishes and clashes between PDF militias, EAOs and the military junta across the country. On 10 September, at least 17 people have been killed during clashes between the military and resistance militia in Myin Thar village, Magway region. On 14 September, the National Unity Government claimed that over 1700 junta soldiers had been killed and 630 wounded in fighting during the previous three months. Several major clashes took place from September to October in Chin State, Sagaing Region, Magwe Region, Kayah State and Shan State.

On 7 October, junta-controlled media reported at least 406 junta informants had been killed and 285 wounded since 1 February in targeted attacks by resistance forces. On the same day, Brigadier-General Phyo Thant, a senior commander of the North-western junta forces was reportedly detained after allegedly contacting resistance forces with the intention of defecting, making him the highest-ranking official to have attempted to defect so far.

Humanitarian crisis
By late September, 8,000 residents of Thantlang town, Chin state, fled to Mizoram, India after houses were set ablaze by the junta army.

On 28 September, at least 20 junta soldiers were reported killed in ambushes in Shan state. At least 4 resistance fighters died in the clashes, along with an unarmed 70-year-old civilian.

On 16 November, junta forces overran and captured the base camp of Kalay PDF in a southwestern district of the Sagaing Region town of Kalay. A total of 9 Kalay PDF medics were captured and 2 PDF fighters were killed, in which the PDF personnel were from the Kalay PDF's Battalion 3.

2021–2022 dry season campaigns 

In late November, the clashes and consolidations made by the renewed civil war and PDF militias slowly lost momentum to a more mobilized junta campaign.

Shan and Kayah State

On 17 November, dozens of junta forces ambushed and captured an outpost of the Moebye PDF in southern Shan State's Pekon Township. Light Infantry Battalion 422 carried out the ambush. The resistance was forced to retreat from the outpost after being surrounded. Later in November, junta forces ambushed and destroyed a base belonging to Monywa PDF's Squadron 205 near Palin village in Monywa, Sagaing Region, forcing resistance fighters to flee. The base was the site of a workshop where the PDF had made explosive devices, which were destroyed during the raid. On 25 November, junta forces ambushed and killed 4 scouting team members from the Karenni Nationalities Defence Force (KNDF) near the village of Hohpeik in Demoso Township. On 12 December, after 4 days of fierce fighting between the combined force of KNDF and Karenni Army (KA) fighters and troops from the military's Light Infantry Battalion 428 and police at least 4 Tatmadaw soldiers were killed.

On 14 December, around 200 Tatmadaw soldiers searched in the town of Lay Kay Kaw Myothit, under the control of KNU Brigade 6 located near the Thai border. Tatmadaw troops then arrested several people believed to be linked to anti-junta movements, including an NLD lawmaker, Wai Lin Aung. The Tatmadaw troops also searched the town looking for activists and members of the People's Defence Force. KNU Brigade 6 spokesperson did not answer to calls asking if the group had authorised the raid. On 20 December, Tatmadaw forces left the village of Kunnar in Loikaw Township after capturing it from KNDF late last week. According to the KNDF member, there were around 130 troops stationed in Kunnar over the weekend.

On 24 December, more than 35 people were massacred when their convoy was ambushed by junta troops near Mo So village of Hpruso town, Kayah State. Two workers for the non-profit group Save the Children remained missing after the attack. The United Nations have called for a 'thorough and transparent investigation' into the incident.

Throughout March, the junta carried out repeated air bombing and looting of villages in Shan and Kayah State, attacking civilians. Amnesty International later accused the junta of collective punishment.

Kachin State
In late November, the Kachin Independence Army (KIA) and 100 junta soldiers engaged in battle near Kachinthay, a village about 16 km east of the town of Shwegu. KIA refused to address rumours of them working with PDF militias and did not provide casualty figures. The clash occurred after an aerial bombardment allegedly carried out by 2 of the recently acquired Su-30 fighter jets that the Myanmar military had been testing. On the same day, Matupi CDF teamed up with the Chin National Army to attack an outpost of Light Infantry Battalion 304 on the road linking Matupi to the town of Paletwa. The resistance forces only managed to kill 2 junta soldiers on guard duty before having to retreat. The junta forces also carried out a night operation in December in which they captured and burned a camp of the Thein Min PDF (TM-PDF) after a heavy firefight. The resistance fighters were then forced to retreat, resulting in 2 TM-PDF fighters killed and several others injured. A little under a week after the junta launched airstrikes against the Kachin Independence Army (KIA) in Mohnyin, about 50 soldiers from Tatmadaw's Infantry Battalion 42 attacked KIA territory near Nyaung Htauk village in Mohnyin from 8:00 am to 6:00 pm. Another clash happened on the same day near Wailon village along the road linking Hpakant with Mohnyin, about 17 miles from Hpakant's urban centre. The junta's artillery unit fired around 30 shells at the site of the clash to support the advance of the infantry unit. KIA's information officer did not want to disclose the details of casualties on their side.

The Kachin Independence Army also claimed that around 200 junta soldiers, including a battalion commander, had been killed in three days of clashes in Hpakant Township in early February.

Central Myanmar

On 9 December, resistance fighters from the Myaing People's Defence Force (PDF) in Magway Region attacked two military vehicles with 3 handmade explosives in an ambush . PDF claimed the ambush injured at least 3 soldiers. Later at noon, PDF attacked soldiers again who were leaving the village of Mintharkya on foot, sparking a shootout between the two sides. Salingyi G-Z Local PDF fighters and one civilian were captured and burned by junta soldiers after PDF fighters had detonated explosives in an attack against a military convoy travelling nearby, triggering an assault on the village by some 100 junta soldiers. On 13 December, Tatmadaw troops launched an offensive against PDF fighters and other local groups in Ke Bar village in Sagaing Region's Ayadaw Township with artillery bombardment assistance. The resistance fighters had to retreat due to the superior firepower of the assaulting Tatmadaw troops.

Over December, the military sent around 150 soldiers of the Airborne Division in six helicopters to the west of Depayin to carry out Air Assault missions. Tatmadaw forces surrounded Sagaing's Depayin Township where PDF fighters were positioned. On 17 December, the Tatmadaw and members of the military-backed Pyusawhti militia launched a surprise air assault on the village of Hnan Khar in Magway Region's Gangaw Township, killing 20 resistance fighters from Yaw Defence Force.

At least 30 junta soldiers and allied militiamen from the Pyusawhti militia were killed by joint PDF attacks in Kani Township, Sagaing Region on February 1, 2022. Flotillas transporting supplies and soldiers by the junta were ambushed, with at least one flotilla set on fire during the attacks. On 7 February, junta soldiers were killed in surprise attacks by local PDFs in the Sagaing Region. These attacks were one of the first attacks where resistance forces used drones.

On 10 February, during the same time as the increased targeted personnel attacks, around 50 Myanmar junta personnel were reportedly killed during raids and ambushes by people's defense forces in three townships in Sagaing Region on 9 February. Later in February, 32 junta soldiers and 20 resistance fighters were killed in clashes in Mobye, southern Shan State as well as in Khin-U Township, Sagaing Region.

Mandalay also saw civilian guerrilla groups with PDFs in Maha Aung Myay and Pyigyidagun Townships shooting at junta forces and throwign homemade bombs. Tatmadaw troops killed 8 Mandalay civilian guerrillas and raided two resistance hideouts in retaliation. At least 4 junta troops were also killed in attacks by PDF forces on 12 February 2022 in Naypyitaw, the capital city, during the military's Union Day celebrations. Many other cities also saw violent clashes during Union Day.

Chin State
On 8 December, a 90-minute clash broke out between the CDF and Tatmadaw forces in the military-occupied town of Thantlang. This was after Tatmadaw launched a major offensive against CDF that lead to the Tatmadaw forces being able to reoccupy the town from the CDF. 3 CDF fighters were reported to have died during the clash. More houses were burned in military-occupied Thantlang this week, with well over a quarter of the Chin State town's buildings now destroyed in 12 incidents, which makes it difficult for CDF rebels to hide in the buildings.

On 30 March, around 20 junta soldiers were reported killed in ambushes targeting junta convoys in Mindat Township, Chin state.

Yangon
Tatmadaw soldiers captured 12 suspected resistance fighters including 3 injured fighters after several bombs exploded by accident in Yangon's Hlaing Thar Yar Township. 2 additional resistance fighters who escaped were also captured later on by plain-clothed and armed Tatmadaw troops who were wearing bulletproof vests. There have been several other cases of guerrilla fighters across Myanmar dying in accidents caused by handmade explosives.

Urban warfare became less practical and resistance forces began targeting junta-aligned officials. According to junta-aligned sources, 367 junta-appointed officials had been assassinated in targeted attacks since February 2021. Resistance forces also began targeting the homes of junta pilots in Yangon in response to airstrikes on civilians.

Karen State 
On the evening of 21 March, Brigade 6 of the Karen National Liberation Army (KNLA) stormed and occupied a Tatmadaw camp in the village of Maw Khi in Wallay Myaing subtownship, Myawaddy District, Kayin State. The Maw Khi camp is located about 50 miles south of Myawaddy, about three miles from the Burmese-Thai border. Eight Tatmadaw soldiers were killed according to Khit Thit Media.

Fighting broke out in parts of Loikaw City on 14 April. Recent combat in Kayin state marked an increase in refugees on the Thai border.

On 15 April, junta soldiers suffered at least 30 casualties after being pushed back by the KNLA at the battle for Lay Kay Kaw. Later in April, two junta officers and 24 men working for the military council's electricity department were arrested by KNDF forces in southern Shan State's Pekon Township.

Other regions 
On 31 January, at least three dozen junta soldiers were reported killed in ambushes over three days in Magwe, Sagaing and Tanintharyi regions and Chin, Shan and Kayah states.  In March, a local defence force based in Tanintharyi Region's Kawthaung District claimed that they managed to kill three Myanmar army soldiers, confiscate weapons and occupy a police station in the area.

In early 2022, the Arakan Army and the junta began clashing again in northern Rakhine State. On 8 February, Arakan Army and junta forces clashed on at least two occasions in Maungdaw in Rakhine State. Fighting broke out on 4 February when junta troops carried out a sneak attack on an AA outpost near the Letpan Mountains northeast of Mee Taik Village, killing an AA sentry, according to AA spokesman Khaing Thukha. Three hours of clashes were also reported on 6 February. The clashes raised fears of a breakdown of the informal ceasefire between the AA and the military which has been in place since November 2020. Two civilians were also reported killed in further clashes in northern Maungdaw on the night of 7 February. Several junta troops, including a Major, were reported killed in the attack.

2022 monsoon season campaigns

With the monsoon season came a general decrease in warfare due to rain and mud. Resistance forces, who were now all past the first anniversary of warfare, found the rain advantageous as the junta could not carry out air strikes as easily.

On 31 May, a bombing killed one person and injures nine others near the Sule Pagoda in Yangon, Myanmar. State media accused the People's Defence Force of responsibility, which the PDF denies.

In June, Resistance groups reached control of 40–50% of the country. Arakan Army claimed to administer most of Rakhine State with an independent government. Chin National Front and Chinland Defense Force made plans to establish a new government. Kachin Independence Army and United Wa State Army consolidated expanded territories. However, the Myanmar Army retained tight control of almost every city in Myanmar and most of the country's natural resources, including important jade mines.

In July, the Karen National Union stated that roughly 2,200 junta soldiers and militiamen had been killed since January 2022. Around 40 junta soldiers and 11 PDF fighters were also reported killed in clashes in Pekon Township, Shan state.

In September, retired Brigadier General Ohn Thwin, mentor to State Administration Council vice-chairman Senior General Soe Win, was assassinated by anti-regime guerilla groups in Yangon. This assassination increases security on high-ranking junta personnel as the highest-ranked Myanmar army member to have been killed so far.

Breakdown of Arakan Ceasefire
Between June and August, the informal ceasefire in late 2020 between the Arakan Army (AA) and the junta broke down. The Arakan Army had consolidated control during this period, avoiding the initial violence of the war and rolled out many public services and local administrators in northern Rakhine state. With the military's attention on the increasing resistance elsewhere and increasing popular support to partner with the NUG, AA began to seek an expansion of its influence into southern Rakhine. Rhetoric from AA leader Twan Mrat Naing in June grew more provocative with military spokepeople stating that AA was inviting conflict.

Armed clashes resumed in July after the junta launched an airstrike against an AA base in Kayin State, killing 6 AA soldiers. AA retaliated in Maungdaw Township and western Chin State in late July and early August. By late August, travel to northern Rakhine required notifying series of checkpoints and all public transport ships ceased operating due to river and land blockades.

Political sentences and international attention 
NUG's Defence Minister Yee Mon asked for international help to arm resistance groups similar to the support given to Ukraine.

On 23 July 2022, the State Administration Council announced that it had executed four political prisoners, including Zayar Thaw and Kyaw Min Yu, marking the first time the death penalty had been carried out in Myanmar since the late 1980s. The event was widely seen as a provocative escalation by the Burmese military in the ongoing conflict. The international community, including United Nations Secretary-General, the G7 nations, Canada, France, Germany, Italy, Japan, the United Kingdom, the United States of America and the European Union strongly condemned the executions.

The military junta court sentenced former state counsellor Aung San Suu Kyi to six years in prison for corruption in July. On 2 September, Aung San Suu Kyi was sentenced to three years in prison after being found guilty of election fraud. She will now serve an overall sentence of 20 years in prison for different charges.

On 16 August, two mortar shells fired from Myanmar Army landed in a Rohingya refugee camp in Bangladesh, killing one man and injuring five others. Myanmar Army helicopters allegedly entered Bangladeshi air space to attack Arakan Army and reportedly fired a shell within Bangladeshi air space. Two days later, Bangladesh summons Myanmar ambassador Aung Kyaw Moe to protest the violation of land and airspace strongly. Later in October, Bangladesh's Foreign Minister AK Abdul Momen made a statement that border bombings by Myanmar stopped after he met Chinese ambassador to Bangladesh Li Jiming.

On 16 September 2022, the Burmese military killed 11 children and wounded another 17 as part of the Let Yet Kone massacre, during an airborne strike at a school in Letyetkone village, Sagaing Region. The military claimed that the village had been harboring resistance fighters from the Kachin Independence Army and the People's Defense Force. The attack was widely condemned by the international community, including the United Nations and European Union.

2022–2023 dry season campaigns

Increased resistance efforts
In mid-October, NUG issued a statement calling for the victory of the Spring Revolution by the end of 2023. This call to action was followed by increased fighting in urban areas and in Southeastern Myanmar with resistance forces. This came in the way of the junta torching at least 20 villages in the Sagaing and Magway regions in order to implement its "four cuts" strategy of attacking civilians to weaken anti-regime movements. However, according to Sagaing-based resistance spokespeople, people who lose everything in these torchings join the resistance These actions may come to define the dry season's increased potential for semi-conventional warfare. The urgency of the resistance may also be ahead of the looming elections planned by the State Administration Council.

The resistance forces also saw major developments. The Karen National Liberation Army stepped-up fighting in southeastern Myanmar and besieged Kawkareik in what looked briefly as the first seizure of a major city by the resistance. Fighting broke out early 21 October when a series of surprise attacks near the highway leading into the city and at government offices within the city. Resistance forces ultimately withdrew two days later after facing junta air strikes. Four days later, undeterred KNLA-led forces seized the junta base of Light Infantry Battalion 339 in Kya Inn Seikgyi Township, Karen State. On 28 October, airstrikes from the junta as part of continued fighting near Kawkareik struck a dam, damaging the dam. Chin state resistance forces used drones in a week-long siege of an outpost in Falam Township, killing 74% of the junta forces stationed. The forces ultimately were unable to take the outpost due to the Air Force's aerial bombardments.

November also saw increased resistance from Bago Region across the region. In Monyo Township, western Bago Region, PDF attacked a police building using cluster bombs. In eastern Bago, 15 Junta soldiers were killed on a Bago PDF raid on a police station in Yedashe Township Thousands of civilians also fled Shwegyin Township as resistance forces seized three military outposts. This joint operation between the KNU and the NUG's PaKaBha was one of the first major uses of the PaKaBha, a shadow township defence force controlled directly by the NUG's Ministry of Defence.

In early December, a video of PDF forces beating and shooting a woman dead emerged on social media. The NUG defence ministry told reporters that the incident happened in June in the town of Tamu, Sagain Region and that they were investigating the incident after detaining the perpetrators involved.

In early January, PDF groups in Kani Township, Sagaing Region attacked junta supply ships, killing at least 25 soldiers. The junta increasingly used waterways for supplies avoiding roadways in resistance-held areas. Clashes between PDF forces near Inle Lake and the Pa-O National Organisation (PNO) also broke out after the PNO coerced villages for speedboats and militia recruits.

Junta retaliation and atrocities

October saw many increased battles and skirmishes, but also several civilian atrocities from the Junta. On 21 October, Junta forces decapitated Saw Tun Moe, a high school teacher, and left his head impaled on a NUG-administered school's spiked gate after burning and looting Taung Myint village in Magway Region Two days later, on 23 October, over 80 people were killed by an airstrike in Hpakant township, Northern Myanmar during a celebration for the 62nd founding anniversary of the Kachin Independence Organization. It became the single deadliest attack on civilians (hence the term Hpakant massacre) since the start of the renewed civil war. The Junta denied there being civilian casualties while the United Nations condemned the attack. Reportedly among the dead was a singer and keyboard player performing at the event. In November, the junta continued burning villages in Sagaing Region including the home of Cardinal Charles Maung Bo, the head of the Catholic Church in Myanmar. Junta soldiers also hid in civilian trucks impersonating workers to ambush local defence forces in Shwebo Township.

In November, resistance forces' ability to hold onto strategic positions and outposts weakened as the dry season allowed greater use of the Myanmar Air Force. During the week of 21 November, repeated junta air attacks along the Sagaing-Kachin border near Mohnyin Township and Banmauk Township killed 80 and potentially disrupted supply chains between the two resistance regions. Some analysts say that the heavy use of air forces indicated a lessened ability for the junta to fight on the ground. On the ground, the junta continued its scorched earth campaign across northern Myanmar, including burning stations they could no longer defend. The campaign formed thousands of residents to flee as hundreds of homes were destroyed. Aerial bombardment, helicopter raids and artillery strikes typically followed skirmishes once junta forces sustained substantial losses and retreated. Once the entrapped junta forces were relieved by aerial support, they would engage in scorched earth tactics. World War Two veterans of the area compare the destruction to be worse than Imperial Japan as civilian villages were not targeted during the war. The junta's operations in Sagaing region included one to secure the area around the Letpadaung mine in Salingyi Township for Chinese workers planning to leave in the upcoming holidays.

On 2 February 2023, Min Aung Hlaing imposed martial law in 37 townships with resistance activity across eight provinces, affecting millions of residents. On 12 February 2023, it was reported that the junta would be issuing firearms licenses to pro-regime civilians, based on a leaked document purportedly from the Home Ministry that sets out licensing requirements and provides for the operation of civilian counter-insurgency units.

Arakan ceasefire and subsequent new fronts 

On 26 November, the Arakan Army and the Junta agreed to a temporary ceasefire starting on 27 November. Yōhei Sasakawa of the Nippon Foundation brokered the ceasefire by acting as an intermediary. Arakan Army spokespeople maintain that they agreed to it for humanitarian reasons and not because of international pressure. The Arakan Army did not withdraw from fortifications held at the time of the ceasefire. Junta spokespeople say that this is the first step towards a permanent ceasefire with the Arakan Army. As of mid-December, tensions remained high with forces from both sides remaining in deployment within northern Rakhine State.

On 30 November, the military launched a major assault on the Kokang Myanmar National Democratic Alliance Army using heavy weapons on a base near Chinshwehaw by the Chinese border. This assault continued into 2 December, reportedly sending 500 junta soldiers.

The military continued its campaign in northern Shan State against the Ta'ang National Liberation Army (TNLA). On 7 December, the junta launched a ground offensive on the TNLA in the Battle of Namhsan utilising aerial bombs. After six days of fighting in the battle, the TNLA captured four villages from junta control killing 70 soldiers and capturing 28. On 17 December the junta retreated claiming that they reached an agreement with TNLA stating that they were targeting PDF forces and mistakenly attacked the TNLA. The TNLA rejected the statement. Continued clashes in late December forced over a thousand civilians to flee to Mogok.

In January 2023, the Myanmar armed forces launched air strikes at a village in Sagaing region, killing seven civilians. On 23 February, army troops launched a new military offensive in Sagaing, raiding and pillaging villages at the confluence of the Irrawaddy and Mu Rivers. During the offensive, troops from the 99th Light Infantry Division executed at least 17 villagers during the Tar Taing massacre. Between 23 February to 5 March, army troops in Sagaing killed a total of 99 villagers, beheaded 20 resistance fighters, and raped at least 3 women.

On 31 January 2023, the Ministry of Home Affairs issued a directive enabling organisations and citizens deemed "loyal to the state," including civilians, civil servants, and army personnel, to obtain firearm licences and permits. The directive stipulates that firearm applicants must be at least 18 years old, and must demonstrate a need for firearms for "personal security." The regulatory shift has enabled the military junta to arm pro-junta paramilitary groups like the Pyusawhti militias and to suppress pro-democracy forces in the country, in light of waning military recruitment and their challenges in concurrently operating in multiple war theatres throughout the country.

Humanitarian conditions 
The human rights situation in Myanmar has deteriorated substantially since the beginning of the civil conflict. As of September 2022, 1.3 million people have been internally displaced, and over 13,000 children have been killed. The Burmese military has escalated its use of war crimes, including murder, sexual violence, torture, and the targeting of civilians. Since the onset of the civil conflict, both the Burmese military and resistance forces alike have used educational facilities as bases and detention sites. In 2021, over 190 violent attacks on schools were reported in 13 of Myanmar's states and regions. As of June 2022, 7.8 million children remained out of school. The junta has also seized the properties of political opponents as part of an intimidation strategy, impacting hundreds of families. Myanmar's public health system has effectively collapsed.

The civil war has worsened the country's food security crisis, with one in four people experiencing food insecurity. Poverty and food insecurity have disproportionately affected Myanmar's Dry Zone and the Irrawaddy delta regions, which account for over 80% of the country's agricultural area, and are home to a third of the country's population.

Economic impact 
Economic conditions in Myanmar have substantially worsened due to the ongoing war and economic mismanagement by the State Administration Council. In 2021, Myanmar's GDP declined by 5.9%. In an interview Christian Lechervy, the French ambassador to Myanmar, highlighted the impact of the coup on the country's economy: "In 2021, Myanmar’s economic growth has contracted by more than 18%, poverty has doubled, the number of people in need of humanitarian aid has multiplied by seven and more than 450,000 people have been forced to flee their homes". Between March and June 2022, almost 10,000 people per month left the country through official channels, worsening the country's brain drain and mirroring the civilian exodus that followed the 1962 and 1988 military coups. The local job market has collapsed. As of September 2022, the value of the Burmese kyat has depreciated by over 60%, while basic commodity prices have increased by up to 57%. The World Bank estimates Myanmar's economy to contract by another 18% in 2022. Since April 2022, the country has experienced foreign currency shortages, which have acutely impacted importers, resulting in shortages of basic products like medicines and fertilisers. The military regime has imposed foreign currency controls, which has worsened the shortage of US dollars among international firms operating in the country. Many foreign and multinational companies, including Telenor, Ooredoo, Chevron, British American Tobacco, and Woodside Petroleum have exited the Burmese market as the conflict has intensified. In September 2022, the G7-led Financial Action Task Force (FATF) announced plans to blacklist Myanmar for failing to stem money laundering and terrorist financing. At that time, only Iran and North Korea were on the Financial Action Task Force blacklist. In October 2022, Myanmar was blacklisted by FATF, which increased volatility in the value of the Burmese kyat.

See also

 Internal conflict in Myanmar
 2021 Myanmar coup d'état
 Myanmar protests (2021–present)

External links 
 International Institute for Strategic Studies – Myanmar Conflict Map
 Special Advisory Council Report – Contestation and Control/Resistance as of 30 June 2022

References

Civil war
Civil war
Civil war
2020s civil wars
21st-century revolutions
Conflicts in 2021
Conflicts in 2022
Conflicts in 2023
Civil war